Chocobo's Dungeon 2 is the 1998 PlayStation sequel to 1997's Chocobo no Fushigina Dungeon.

Gameplay
The player will play as Chocobo, navigating randomly-generated levels of mysterious dungeons to progress the story. Each time the player enters the same dungeon, the path through the maze will be different, although the same set of monsters will be encountered. Chocobo may have a partner character assisting him throughout the dungeon, which typically resolves in a boss fight. There are several partner characters, most of which will be recognizable to Final Fantasy veterans, including Final Fantasy mainstay Cid; a young white mage girl, Shiroma; and Mog, a moogle. Though the game is an isometric 2D adventure, there are occasionally 3D cutscenes.

In the beginning of the game, Chocobo can only carry a few items in his inventory. If he dies in the dungeon, all items in the inventory are lost. As the game progresses, the player will be able to rent storage space in town and send extra items there. Items in storage are not lost if Chocobo dies. Deeper dungeons become more difficult and more powerful items are obtainable.

Combat is conducted in a turn-based manner, with player and enemy alternating their actions. Chocobo and his partner can attack in any of eight different directions. Aside from attacking, characters may also use items, spells, or character-specific abilities. These actions may be augmented by feathers, which provides special abilities such as kicking items through wall, unlocking area of effect spells, and substituting the partner with powerful summon characters.

Chocobo can also equip various claws as weapons and saddles as armors. Claws and saddles may be combined in stoves to improve its statistics and with the correct combination, produce powerful effects such as the ability to attack in multiple directions or resistance to multiple status effects. Chocobo and his partner can also temporarily assume the form of some of the creatures from the game through the use of morph tonic or traps, gaining unique abilities such as flying over traps or turning enemies into toads.

After the credits run at the end of the game, the player is offered a new mode where it is possible to revisit any of the dungeons as one of Chocobo's partners. This second playthrough also has a secret dungeon with 30 levels.

Development and release
Squaresoft announced Chocobo's Dungeon 2 in July 1998, alongside plans to release the game that December. Chocobo's Mysterious Dungeon, the game's predecessor, had been released the previous year. Chocobo's Dungeon 2 became the first Mystery Dungeon title released outside Japan. IGN was surprised that the word "mysterious" was removed from the title, and wonderered why the game was being released in America as the previous title had moderate sales in Japan, and the original had never been released at all outside Japan. They also noted that it seemed to generate the least amount of "fanfare" or press attention of Square’s announcements at the 1999 Tokyo Game Show.

Longtime Chocobo character designer Toshiyuki Itahana made designs and models for the protagonist of Chocobo's Dungeon 2. The music was composed by Kenji Ito, and was well reviewed by RPGFan, saying the music was lighthearted, enjoyable, and no tracks were "skippable".

On release, the game came packed with demos of game such as Parasite Eve or Bushido Blade 2. A version of the game was planned for the WonderSwan Color, but was never released.

Story

Characters
There are many characters in Chocobo's Dungeon 2, and each of them helps Chocobo in a different way at one point in the game. For example, Mrs. Bomb lets Chocobo stay at her house.

Some characters join Chocobo and can be controlled by a second player or the AI. These include Mog, Shiroma, and Cid. There are also characters that Chocobo can summon by collecting feathers, such as Titan, Sylph, Ramuh and Bahamut.

Setting
Chocobo's Dungeon 2 is mostly based in a village. There is a beach near the village and a vast sea. Towering over the village is a large tower covered in ivy, Cid's Tower. North of the village is a huge forest, a swamp and a looming mountain, Snow Mountain. When progressing through the game, the overworld changes a few times.

Plot
At the start of the game, Mog takes Chocobo treasure hunting.  They enter a monster-filled dungeon and Mog flicks a switch that separates him from Chocobo. Chocobo then meets the white mage Shiroma. She claims she has important work to do in the dungeon and leaves. Then Chocobo enters the dungeon again and finds Shiroma again.

Shiroma decides to help Chocobo find his friend Mog. They succeed, but due to Mog's greed he ends up sinking the dungeon into the sea and destroying Shiroma's home, forcing them to go to a nearby village where Shiroma's "Aunt Bomb" lets Mog and Chocobo stay. However, Shiroma is then kidnapped and it is up to Chocobo to save her. Chocobo gets the help of the local inventor Cid after helping him clear out the imps taking over his tower.

Reception

Chocobo's Dungeon 2 was received with generally negative reviews, such as IGN calling the game "boring", and saying that "It lacks just about every feature that is important in a masterful role-playing experience". GameSpot praised the game's graphical design, calling it endearing, and praising the game's replayability. GameFan called the game "slow-paced, drab and gloomy", saying the gameplay is repetitive and boring, and describing the dungeons as mono-colored. Chris Charla reviewed the game for Next Generation and stated that "If you're looking for something new, look elsewhere. If you're looking for something classic done with more advanced graphics, you've found it." Famitsu Weekly rated Chocobo's Dungeon 2 as the 53rd best PlayStation game in November 2000.

Legacy
Square Enix designers considered basing Chocobo's Mystery Dungeon Every Buddy!, a 2019 remaster of the Wii game Final Fantasy Fables: Chocobo's Dungeon, around Chocobo's Dungeon 2, as it was cited as one of the more popular Chocobo Dungeon games in the series. The enemy creature Skull Hammer was incorporated into that port.

Notes

References

External links

Chocobo games
1998 video games
PlayStation (console) games
PlayStation Network games
Video games developed in Japan
Video games scored by Tsuyoshi Sekito
Video games scored by Yasuhiro Kawakami